Arudan-e Olya (also Romanized as Ārūdān-e ‘Olyā; also known as Aroodan, Arūdān, Arūdān-e Bālā, and Arudūn) is a village in Arudan Rural District, in the Central District of Mohr County, Fars Province, Iran. At the 2006 census, its population was 1,755, in 357 families.

References 

Populated places in Mohr County